Two vessels of the German Kaiserliche Marine (Imperial Navy) have been named Loreley:

 , a paddle steamer aviso
 , a gunboat

German Navy ship names